King Solomon's Mines is a 1985 action adventure film, and a film adaptation of the 1885 novel of the same name by H. Rider Haggard. It stars Richard Chamberlain, Sharon Stone, Herbert Lom and John Rhys-Davies. It was produced by Cannon Films. It was adapted by Gene Quintano and James R. Silke and directed by J. Lee Thompson. This version of the story was a light, comedic take, deliberately referring to, and parodying, the Indiana Jones film series (in which Rhys-Davies had also appeared). It was filmed outside Harare in Zimbabwe. The film was made and released exactly 100 years after the release of the novel on which the film is based.

King Solomon's Mines was followed by a sequel (filmed back-to-back), Allan Quatermain and the Lost City of Gold (1986). It was originally planned to be the first in a trilogy, and there were two attempts to film a third movie: first, a film that would have been based on She and Allan, another Haggard novel, and then a film which would have been titled Allan Quatermain and the Jewel of the East, to be directed by producer Menahem Golan. Neither attempt was successful, in part due to the financial failure of Lost City of Gold.

Plot

Jesse Huston (Sharon Stone) has hired Allan Quatermain to find her father, believed lost on an expedition to find the fabled King Solomon's Mines. Together with his companion, the mysterious Umbopo, they penetrate unknown country, following a map believed to be genuine. It transpires that Professor Huston has been captured by a German military expedition on the same quest, led by Bockner (Herbert Lom), a single-minded knackwurst-munching, bald-headed Colonel and a ruthless Turkish slave-trader and adventurer, Dogati (John Rhys-Davies), who is a long-standing adversary of Quatermain. Huston is being forced to interpret another map, also believed to be genuine.

The two rival expeditions shadow each other, clashing on several occasions, but Quatermain's group manages to rescue Professor Huston, who confirms the mines are indeed real and he implores Quatermain to stop Bockner and Dogati from finding them. After a few harrowing encounters with both the Germans and some of the local native tribes, they finally enter the tribal lands of the Kukuana who capture them. The tribe is under the control of the evil priestess, Gagoola, who has Quatermain hung upside down over a pond full of crocodiles. Just when all seems lost, Umbopo arrives and after defeating Gagoola's warriors in combat, reveals his identity as an exiled tribal chief and the rightful ruler of the Kukuanas.

As the tribesmen submit to him, Bockner and Dogati attack the village in full force. Amid the ensuing chaos, Gagoola captures Jesse and flees into caves in the depths of the Breasts of Sheba, the twin mountain peaks where the mines are located. Quatermain and Umbopo give chase after them and they are in turn pursued by Bockner and Dogati.  They follow Quatermain and Umbopo to the entrance to the mines, but are hampered by a moat of quicksand. Bockner orders his men forward into the moat, but they have trouble crossing it. Dogati then shoots down all of Bockner's soldiers, as well as most of his own men, and uses their bodies as stepping stones to cross the moat safely. As they approach the entrance, Bockner shoots Dogati and takes command of what little remains of the party.

Inside the mines, Quatermain and Umbopo rescue Jesse and find the resting place of all the former tribal queens, including the Queen of Sheba herself, encased in crystal. Umbopo explains that Gagoola had attempted to sacrifice Jesse in order to keep her power as the Kukuanas' ruler because of Jesse's strong resemblance to the Queen of Sheba. Then Gagoola appears and taunts Umbopo, who pursues her through the caverns.

As Bockner and his men arrive next, Quatermain and Jesse flee for safety, but end up in the cavern's treasure chamber, which is full of raw diamonds and other priceless treasures. As they gather some of the diamonds to take with them, Bockner hears their voices from outside the chamber, but before he can enter, Gagoola activates a hidden rock switch and seals Quatermain and Jesse inside the chamber. The switch also triggers a trap that causes the ceiling of the chamber, which is lined with stalactites to lower on them. Quatermain and Jesse manage to stop the ceiling trap, but then the chamber begins filling up with water. Just as the chamber fills completely, a lit stick of dynamite set by Bockner outside the chamber door explodes, sending them both spewing out of the chamber in the resulting flood to safety.

Bockner enters the chamber and quickly lays claim to the treasure, only to be confronted by a wounded, but very much alive, Dogati, who was wearing a protective vest that shielded him from the bullets. He then forces Bockner to swallow some of the diamonds, intending to cut him open to retrieve them later on. Meanwhile, Umbopo finally corners Gagoola. But rather than face his judgment, she instead leaps down one of the volcano's shafts and is incinerated when she lands in the molten lava below. However, the reaction causes a series of eruptions throughout the mines. Dogati is partially buried when the treasure chamber's ceiling collapses, but Bockner is unharmed. He gloats to Dogati after claiming a few more diamonds for himself, then leaves the chamber. But not before firing his gun at the ruined ceiling, burying Dogati alive. Quatermain, Jesse and Umbopo quickly flee for their lives through the collapsing caverns. They cross over a small booby- trapped lake (which one of Bockner's men fell victim to earlier), only to be stopped by Bockner, who demands they surrender their diamonds to him. Quatermain places the diamonds on the central stepping stone that triggers the trap and tells Bockner to come take the diamonds himself if he wants them. Bockner does so and falls into the lake, only to be seized in the jaws of a Mokele-mbembe and dragged beneath the water. The trap resets itself and the diamonds rise back to the surface, but Umbopo warns Quatermain and Jesse not to take them, saying they belong to the mountain.

The trio continue their escape through the caverns, which becomes even more dangerous as the lava chamber they are in is full of fire and falling rocks. Quatermain tells Umbopo to take Jesse through to safety while he follows them. But before he can do so, he is struck down by Dogati, who survived the cave-in. A brutal fight between them ensues, but Quatermain gains the upper hand at the last instant, sending Dogati falling into the chamber's lava pit to his death. Quatermain manages to escape from the mines at the last minute, just as the volcano explodes, sealing the entrance forever.

Returning to the village, Umbopo assumes his rightful place as the ruler of the Kukuanas and he and his people bid a fond farewell to Quatermain and Jesse. As they exit the village, they each reveal they had kept a diamond from the mines as a souvenir of their adventure and the movie ends with them kissing outside the village gates.

Cast

 Richard Chamberlain as Allan Quatermain
 Sharon Stone as Jesse Huston
 Herbert Lom as Colonel Bockner
 John Rhys-Davies as Dogati
 Ken Gampu as Umbopo
 June Buthelezi as Gagoola
 Sam Williams as Scragga
 Shaike Ophir as Kassam
 Mick Lesley as Dorfman
 Vincent Van der Byl as Shack
 Bob Greer as Hamid
 Oliver Tengende as Bushiri
 Neville Thomas as German Pilot
 Bishop McThuzen as Dari
 Isiah Murert as Rug Carrier

Production
It was Richard Chamberlain's first feature since The Last Wave. "I haven't seen any scripts of anything I wanted to do", said Chamberlain prior to filming. "But I love doing miniseries, so it's not as if I've been pining away all this time. King Solomon's Mines is not a remake of the old Stewart Granger trek through the jungle. It's a sensational script. It's very much a Raiders of the Lost Ark type of movie – very tongue-in-cheek and full of adventures and stunts....  Bullets flying, lions eating people, witches up in the trees. All that stuff."
 
Kathleen Turner was reportedly offered $1.5 million to play the female lead but turned it down because the role was too similar to the one she played in Romancing the Stone.

The film was shot on location in the Mashonaland region of northeastern Zimbabwe over ten months. The crew included many Israelis and South Africans, which caused some objections from the local Arab population. The Arab League protested the depiction of all the Arab characters as slavers. Richard Chamberlain said, "I happen to think that people are people and I don't care where they come from as long as they do a good job.... This is a comedy, and one of the best defenses against out-of-date stereotypes is to poke fun at them. It shows how absurd they are."

It was shot simultaneously with a sequel.

Soundtrack
The film's score was composed and conducted by Jerry Goldsmith, and performed by the Hungarian State Opera Orchestra. Restless Records issued an album on LP and cassette; Milan later released it on compact disc minus the cue "The Ritual" and paired with Alan Silvestri's The Delta Force. In 1991 Intrada Records released an expanded version, later reissued in 1997; Prometheus released the complete score in 2006. Quartet Records issued a two-disc edition in 2014 with the Prometheus content on disc one and the original album presentation on disc two.

Quartet release
Tracks in bold premiered on the Intrada CD, tracks in italics premiered on the Prometheus edition.

Disc 1: The Film Score

 Main Title (3:40)
 Welcoming Committee (0:51)
 No Sale (3:38)
 The Mummy (1:15)
 Have a Cigar (3:39)
 Good Morning (2:32)
 Under the Train (3:08)
 Dancing Shots (3:38)
 Pain (3:07)
 The Chieftain (1:03)
 Percussion Sweetener (0:40)
 Pot Luck (3:23)
 Upside Down People (5:04)
 The Crocodiles (3:08)
 The Mines (1:25)
 Pre-Ritual/The Ritual, Part I/The Ritual, Part II (6:16)
 Low Bridge (3:28)
 Falling Rocks (1:07)
 Final Confrontation (3:11)
 No Diamonds (4:14)
 Bonus Track: Ride (3:06)
 Bonus Track: Theme From King Solomon's Mines (3:40)

Disc 2: The Original Album

 King Solomon's Mines (Main Title) (3:39)
 Upside Down People (4:51)
 The Crocodiles (3:07)
 Pot Luck (3:23)
 Forced Flight (5:22)
 Dancing Shots (3:38)
 Good Morning (2:33)
 No Pain (3:07)
 The Ritual (5:05)
 No Diamonds (End Title) (4:21)

Reception

Box Office
The film earned $5 million in its opening weekend. The film overperformed in every single media market in Alabama, Tennessee, North Carolina, South Carolina, Georgia, Indiana, Wisconsin as well as some media markets in southeastern Minnesota. That overperformance was largely attributed to the Cannon Group, Inc. overspending on marketing in those media markets before reining in their own spending. The overperformance at the box office in those media markets allowed the film to not only make all of the production money back, but to go even further and make several million dollars in profit for the Cannon Group.

Critical
King Solomon's Mines holds a 13% approval rating at Rotten Tomatoes with an average rating of 3.7/10. On Metacritic the film has a weighted average score of 29 out of 100, based on 5 critics, indicating "generally unfavorable reviews". Though it made a profit, the film was panned by critics, many of whom felt it was not as good as the 1950 film version with Stewart Granger and Deborah Kerr. The film "did significantly better with general audiences than it did with critics" as audiences were "far more forgiving a movie that was 'intended' to be extremely cheesy" while professional critics "correctly pointed out that it wasn't nearly as good as the Stewart Granger version of the same movie, while failing to acknowledge that it wasn't supposed to be as good, and at no point took itself seriously as movie."

It was nominated for two Razzie Awards, including Worst Supporting Actor for Herbert Lom and Worst Musical Score for Goldsmith.

Sequels
The direct sequel, Allan Quatermain and the Lost City of Gold, was released in 1987 with both Richard Chamberlain and Sharon Stone returning. Director J. Lee Thompson did not return, choosing instead to direct Murphy's Law with Charles Bronson. The sequel was directed by television veteran Gary Nelson and was a critical and box office disappointment.

The Cannon Group had originally planned a trilogy of films, the third film was to be an adaptation of She and Allan but this was ultimately abandoned after the extreme negative reception of Allan Quatermain and the Lost City of Gold, coupled with the financial difficulties of the company at the time.

In 2011, a new sequel was proposed by Menahem Golan called Allan Quatermain and the Jewel of the East. The script was written by Golan and Richard Albiston, to be directed by Golan himself. The plot concerned Quatermain attempting to rescue his daughter from Chinese treasure hunters in the Congo. According to the 2015 documentary Golan: A Farewell to Mr. Cinema, Richard Chamberlain had agreed to return as the title character, but Golan died before the film began shooting.

Releases
MGM released the film on DVD on February 10, 2004.

On December 3, 2014, Umbrella Entertainment in Australia released a Region 4 DVD of the movie.

References

External links
 
 
 
 
 
 
 Zone Troopers: Website about the different Allan Quatermain and King Solomon's Mine films

1985 films
1980s action adventure films
1980s fantasy adventure films
Films based on King Solomon's Mines
Films scored by Jerry Goldsmith
Films directed by J. Lee Thompson
Films set in Africa
Films set in a fictional country
Films set in the 1910s
Films shot in Zimbabwe
Golan-Globus films
Treasure hunt films
Films with screenplays by Gene Quintano
Films produced by Menahem Golan
Films produced by Yoram Globus
1980s English-language films
American action adventure films
American fantasy adventure films
1980s American films